Blagnac is a commune in the Haute-Garonne department in southwestern France. The city hosts the aviation museum Aeroscopia.

It is the third-largest suburb of the city of Toulouse, although governed by a separate council, and is adjacent to it on the northwest side. It is a member of the Toulouse Métropole.

Geography
The river Touch forms part of the commune's southern border, then flows into the Garonne, which forms all of its eastern border.

38% percent of the area is made up of green spaces, mainly along the river Garonne and in parks.

Population

Economy
Airbus and ATR have their head offices in Blagnac. Mecachrome, a diversified precision engineering company with extensive experience in motorsport, has its headquarters in the commune.

Education
Blagnac has a student capacity of 5,500 in seven nurseries (écoles maternelles), five primary schools, two high schools/junior high schools (collèges), one sixth form college/senior high school (lycée), and a private school.

Public secondary schools:
 Collège Mermoz
 Collège Henry-Guillaume
 Lycée Saint-Exupéry

The private school is Établissement Le Ferradou, serving primary through senior high.

The European aircraft manufacturer Airbus has also one of its eight worldwide training centres : Airbus Training Centre Europe.

Transport
Local transport is operated by Tisséo. Buses 70 and 71 run to Jeanne d'Arc (connection with Line B of the Toulouse Metro) and bus 66 runs to St Cyprien République (connection with Line A), both in the city centre. Bus 25 circles the suburb and stops at the Airport, and bus 17 connects Blagnac to Mondonville, toward the northwest. A shuttlebus (navette) connects the Airport to the city centre. A new tramway now operates southwards to the Toulouse Arènes station where it connects with Line A of the Metro.

Car attack 
On 10 November 2017 a man drove into three students, aged between 22 and 23, outside their college.  One was in a serious condition. It was thought the driver was suffering from major psychological problems.  A public prosecutor at the time said there was no evidence the attack was linked to terrorism.

See also

 Toulouse Blagnac International Airport
 Blagnac SCR
 Blagnac FC
 Communes of the Haute-Garonne department

References

External links

Official site

Communes of Haute-Garonne